Dar el-Salam is a small Upper Egyptian city near Akhmim. It is located on the east bank of the Nile, in the Sohag Governorate.

The city used to be two separate villages – Naga el Daba and El Galaila.

About 
The city of Dar el-Salam had a population of 39,500 in 2001.

In a 2008 report produced by the local authorities of Dar el-Salam, a high illiteracy rate of 35% amongst males and 48% amongst females was identified, putting the overall illiteracy rate at 41.5% of the total population.

In 2011, Dar el-Salam was identified by the United Nations Development Programme's Egypt Human Development Report (EHDR) as one of Egypt's five poorest districts on the Human Development Index for the second year in a row.

Sectarianism 
In 2008 sectarian clashes occurred in the Dar El Salam region in the village Kosheh between Coptic Christians and Muslims resulting in the deaths of 20 Copts and 1 Muslim.

In 2008 in the town of Beit Alim, a vendetta feud between two families left 22 members of one family dead, including a nine-year-old child.

See also

 List of cities and towns in Egypt

References

Populated places in Sohag Governorate